P. K. Chandran (born 10 May 1952) is an Indian translator and creative writer in Malayalam and Hindi. His Karnan, a translation of Shivaji Sawant's Marathi novel Mrityunjay, won the Sahitya Akademi Translation Prize in 2001.

Early life

Personal life

Books 

 Insulted and Humiliated Characters in Puranas (Sarthak Prakasan, New Delhi)
 Kunthiparvam (Chithra Publishers, Tvm) Droupati (DC Books,Kottayam)
 Gandhari (DC Books,Kottayam)
 Sita (DC Books,Kottayam)
 Kunthi (DC Books,Kottayam)
 Drona(DC Books,Kottayam)
 Sathivathy (DC Books,Kottayam)
 Bheeshma (DC Books,Kottayam)
 Yayathi (DC Books,Kottayam)
 Ravanan (DC Books,Kottayam)

Translations 

 Karnan (Mrityunjaya of Sivaji Sawant - DC Books Marathi)
 Yantra (Malayattoor Ramakrishnan - National Books Trust -Malayalam)
Samakaleena Cherukathakal (National Books Trust - Malayalam)
 Yugandharan (Yugandhar of Sivaji Sawant- Kendra Sahitya Academy, New Delhi - Marathi )
 Mohammed Rafi - sangeethavum jeevithavum (Hindi)
 Njan Hinduvanu (Asghar Wajahat - Hindi)
 Saadat Hasan Mantoyude Kathakal (Saadat Hasan Manto - Urdu)
 Avarnan (Sharan Kumar Limbale -Marathi)

Awards 
 Sahitya Akademi Translation Prize for Karnan

References

External links 
 AKADEMI TRANSLATION PRIZES (1989-2015)

1952 births
Living people
Translators to Malayalam
Writers from Kozhikode
Recipients of the Sahitya Akademi Prize for Translation